Eight Taels of Gold is a 1989 Hong Kong drama film directed by Mabel Cheung. The film was selected as the Hong Kong entry for the Best Foreign Language Film at the 63rd Academy Awards, but was not accepted as a nominee.

Cast
 Sammo Hung as 'Slim' Cheng
 Sylvia Chang as Odds and Ends

See also
 List of submissions to the 63rd Academy Awards for Best Foreign Language Film
 List of Hong Kong submissions for the Academy Award for Best Foreign Language Film

References

External links
 

1989 films
1989 crime drama films
1980s Cantonese-language films
Hong Kong crime drama films
1980s Hong Kong films